John Paul Kotter is the Konosuke Matsushita Professor of Leadership, Emeritus, at the Harvard Business School, an author, and the founder of Kotter International, a management consulting firm based in Seattle and Boston. He is a thought leader in business, leadership, and change.

Career
In 2008, he co-founded Kotter International with two others, where he currently serves as Chairman. The business consultancy firm applies Kotter's research on leadership, strategy execution, transformation, and any form of large-scale change.

Since early in his career, Kotter has received numerous awards for his thought leadership in his field from Harvard Business Review, Bloomberg BusinessWeek, Thinkers50, Global Gurus and others.

Personal life
Kotter lives in Boston, Massachusetts with his wife, Nancy Dearman. They have two children.

Written work 
Kotter is the author of 21 books, as listed below. 12 of these have been business bestsellers and two of which are overall New York Times bestsellers.

Successful change

In Leading Change (1996), and subsequently in The Heart of Change (2002), Kotter describes an eight stage model of successful change in which he seeks to support managers to lead change and to understand how people accept, engage with and maintain successful organisational change. The eight stages or steps include the creation of "a sense of urgency" and the use of "short-term wins".

Short-term wins, within a 6–18 month window, are considered necessary because "[an] organization has to realize some benefits from [a] change effort to maintain stakeholder commitment". Kotter asserts that to be useful or influential, short-term wins need to be "visible and unambiguous" as well as "closely related to the change effort". Arguing against a belief that there is a "trade-off" between wins in the short-term and wins in the long-term, Kotter argues from experience that both are achievable.

References

External links

 Harvard Business School Faculty Bio
 2006 IMNO Interview
 Kotter International home page

1947 births
American business theorists
Massachusetts Institute of Technology alumni
MIT Sloan School of Management alumni
Living people
Harvard Business School alumni
Harvard Business School faculty
People from San Diego
People from Ashland, New Hampshire
People from Cambridge, Massachusetts